Eurema smilax, the small grass yellow, is a small pierid butterfly species found in Australia, including Lord Howe Island. It is also present on Java.

The wingspan is about 30 mm. The upper surfaces of the wings are yellow with a black band around the edge, and a black dot near the middle. The undersides are yellow with variable brown markings.
The species exhibits seasonal wet-season and dry-season forms.

The larvae have been recorded feeding on Cassia fistula, Neptunia monosperma, Neptunia gracilis, Senna acclinis, Senna coriacea, Senna coronilloides, Cassia nemophila, Senna artemisioides petiolaris and Senna guadichaudii.

References

Complete Field Guide to Butterflies of Australia by Michael F Braby, 2004

smilax
Butterflies described in 1805